is the 14th single released by Japanese singer Maaya Sakamoto. "Kazemachi Jet" and "Spica" were featured as the ending song for the second season of Tsubasa Chronicle. Sakamoto had stated that the two songs in this single were meant to represent Syaoran and Sakura's view in Tsubasa. "Kazemachi Jet" represents Syaoran while "Spica" represents Sakura; there are several clear references in the songs.

Single Track Listing

Charts

References

2006 singles
Maaya Sakamoto songs
Songs written by Maaya Sakamoto
Tsubasa: Reservoir Chronicle